Grove Municipal Airport  is a city-owned, public-use airport located two nautical miles (4 km) northeast of the central business district of Grove, a city in Delaware County, Oklahoma, United States. It is included in the National Plan of Integrated Airport Systems for 2011–2015, which categorized it as a general aviation facility.

Although most U.S. airports use the same three-letter location identifier for the FAA and IATA, this airport is assigned GMJ by the FAA, but has no designation from the IATA.

Facilities and aircraft 
Grove Municipal Airport covers an area of 123 acres (50 ha) at an elevation of 831 feet (253 m) above mean sea level. It has one runway designated 18/36 with an asphalt surface measuring 5,200 by 75 feet (1,585 x 23 m).

For the 12-month period ending July 10, 2008, the airport had 22,820 aircraft operations, an average of 62 per day: 99.8% general aviation and 0.2% military. At that time there were 60 aircraft based at this airport: 85% single-engine, 13% multi-engine, and 2% helicopter.

References

External links 
 Grove Municipal Airport
 Grove Municipal Airport (GMJ) at Oklahoma Aeronautics Commission
 Aerial image as of March 1995 from USGS The National Map
 

Airports in Oklahoma
Buildings and structures in Delaware County, Oklahoma
Transportation in Delaware County, Oklahoma